The Keith House in Austin, Texas is a historic home in the Pemberton Heights neighborhood in central Austin.

The home was built in 1933 by local builder William Dixon Anderson for his sister, Maggie Mae Keith, and her husband, Jacque Nicholas Keith. It features elements of the Monterey Revival and Colonial Revival styles, popular at the time.

The home is located at 2400 Harris Blvd. It was added to the National Register of Historic Places in 1998.

References

External links
The Keith House: Gateway to Pemberton

Houses on the National Register of Historic Places in Texas
Houses in Austin, Texas
Houses completed in 1933
National Register of Historic Places in Austin, Texas
Recorded Texas Historic Landmarks
City of Austin Historic Landmarks